The 2015–16 National Basketball League (Bulgaria) season was the 75th season of the Bulgarian NBL. The season started on October 10, 2015.

Teams

Regular season

Playoffs

NBL clubs in European competitions

External links
NBL official website

References

National Basketball League (Bulgaria) seasons
Bulgarian
Basketball